The 2021 Kazakhstan Super Cup is the 14th edition of the Kazakhstan Super Cup, an annual football competition for clubs in the  Kazakh football league system that were successful in its major competitions in the preceding season. 

It will be the first edition of the tournament to be played under the new format with four teams. As the 2020 Kazakhstan Cup was cancelled, the competition will feature the top four teams from the 2020 Kazakhstan Premier League season, these being champions Kairat, runners-up Tobol, third placed Astana and fourth placed Shakhter Karagandy.

Qualification

Qualified teams 
The following four teams qualified for the tournament.

Draw

Matches

Bracket

Semi-finals

Match for third place

Final

See also 
2021 Kazakhstan Premier League

Notes

References

2021